The 71st Bengal Film Journalists' Association Awards were held on September 11, 2013 after six years, at The Science City Auditorium, Kolkata. honoring the best Indian cinema in 2012.

Best Film 
 Bhooter Bhabishyat - Anik Dutta
 Chitrangada: The Crowning Wish - Rituporno Ghosh
 Aparajita Tumi - Aniruddha Roy Chowdhury

Best Director 
 Anik Dutta - Bhooter Bhabishyat

Best Actor 
 Dev - Khokababu

Best Actress 
 Rituparna Sengupta - Muktodhara
 Koel Mallick - Hemlock Society

Best Music 
 Jeet Ganguly - Paglu 2

Best Lyricist 
 Priyo Chattopadhyay - Khokababu for the song "Soniye Tu"

Best Male Playback Singer 
 Anupam Roy - Hemlock Society

Best Female Playback Singer 
 Lopamudra Mitra - Hemlock Society

Best Original Story 
 Bhooter Bhabishyat - Anik Dutta

Best Promising Director 
 Raj Chakraborty

Best Promising Actor 
 Hiran Chatterjee - Macho Mustanaa

Best Promising Actress 
 Mimi Chakraborty - Bapi Bari Ja

Best Cameraman 
 Premendu Bikash Chaki - Mayabazar

Best Editor 
 Sandip Dutta - Mayabazar

Best Art Director 
 Ananda Addya - Hemlock Society

Best Make-Up Man 
 Md. Yonis - Bojhena Shey Bojhena

Best Special Jury Award 
 Swastika Mukherjee - Bhooter Bhabishyat

Most Outstanding Work of The Year 
 Prosenjit Chatterjee - Aparajita Tumi

Best Book on Cinema 
 Cinemar Kathakata - Chandi Mukherjee

Lifetime achievement award
 Tarun Majumdar
 Aparna Sen

Evergreen Actor 
 Chiranjeet

References 

Bengal Film Journalists' Association Awards
2013 Indian film awards